Calvene is a town in the province of Vicenza, Veneto, Italy. It is east of SP349. The population has remained relatively stable throughout the years.  The most recent census showed 1324 inhabitants.

Sources

External links
(Google Maps)
(Official Calvene Homepage)

Cities and towns in Veneto